Lake Lawtonka is a lake in Comanche County in the state of Oklahoma in the United States.

The lake provides the water supply for the Fort Sill and Lawton communities as situated south of the water reservoir. The town of Medicine Park is south of the lake and provides a visual of the Lawtonka dam. Lawtonka Acres and Robinson's Landing Marina are located at the north shoreline boundaries of the Lawtonka recreation area.

Recreation
Fishing and camping facilities are maintained by the city of Lawton.

Landscape Pictorial

See also
 Cache Creek (Oklahoma)
 Mount Scott (Oklahoma)
 Wichita Mountains
 Wichita Mountains Wildlife Refuge

References

External links
 
 
 
 
 Merriam-Webster's Geographical Dictionary, Third Edition. Springfield, Massachusetts: Merriam-Webster, Incorporated, 1997. .
 Oklahoma Digital Maps: Digital Collections of Oklahoma and Indian Territory

Reservoirs in Oklahoma
Bodies of water of Comanche County, Oklahoma